Binti is an Africanfuturist science fiction horror novella written by Nnedi Okorafor.  The novella was published in 2015 by Tor.com. Binti is the first novella in Okorafor's Binti novella series.

Binti won multiple prominent literary awards, including the 2016 Hugo Award for Best Novella and the 2016 Nebula Award for the same category. A television adaptation is reportedly under development at Hulu.

Plot
A young woman named Binti is the first member of the Himba people from Earth to be accepted into the prestigious intergalactic university Oomza Uni. Upon being notified of her acceptance, Binti runs away from home and boards a transport ship to Oomza Uni. While in transit, the ship is hijacked by the Meduse, a jellyfish-like alien species that was previously at war with the Khoush, another human ethnic group. After the Meduse murder all other inhabitants of the ship, Binti retreats into her private living quarters. She subsequently discovers that a piece of ancient technology she had brought with her from Earth, referred to as her edan, enables direct communication with the Meduse, and that her otjize, a type of mixed clay made from the soil of her homeland, has healing properties when applied to the tentacles of the Meduse. She makes a friend in one of the younger, more hot-headed Meduse, named Okwu, and subsequently brokers a tentative truce between herself and the hijacker; the truce entails Binti's profound physical transformation. Upon arrival at the university, she is able to negotiate a short lasting peace between the Meduse and the human race, after which she begins her studies at Oomza Uni in earnest.

Awards and nominations
 2016 Hugo Award winner for Best Novella
 2015 Nebula Award winner for Best Novella
 2016 BookTube SFF Award winner for Best Novella (popular vote)
 2015 BSFA Award finalist for Best Short Story
 2016 British Fantasy Award finalist for Best Novella
 2016 Locus Award finalist for Best Novella
 2017 Nommo Award winner for Best Novella

Sequels
The novella has 3 sequels. The first, Binti: Home, was released on January 31, 2017. The third installment, Binti: The Night Masquerade, was released in January 2018, and was nominated for the 2019 Hugo Award for Best Novella. Subsequently, DAW/Penguin/PRH published an omnibus edition of the three novellas with an additional short story titled "Binti: Sacred Fire", which serves as an interlude between Binti and Home.

References

External links
 

Nigerian science fiction novels
English-language novels
Africanfuturist novels
2015 American novels
American science fiction novels
Tor Books books
Hugo Award for Best Novella winning works
Nebula Award for Best Novella-winning works
Works by Nnedi Okorafor
2015 science fiction novels
2015 Nigerian novels
American novellas